A Santa Ana man drove into a Costa Mesa preschool playground on May 3, 1999 and killed two students and injured four other students and a teacher's aide.

Incident 
The driver, Steven Allen Abrams, drove his 1967 Cadillac into the playground of the Southcoast Early Childhood Learning Center on May 3, 1999 around 5 pm. He drove the vehicle through the chain link fence around the playground and aimed for those in the playground. Witnesses stated Abrams drove past the playground and then U-turned back towards the playground before he accelerated into the schoolyard at a speed of 35 to 40 mph. He continued through the playground, before he crashed into a tree, and trapped two boys and one girl underneath his vehicle.

Victims 
The two deceased victims were Brandon Wiener, 3-years-old and Sierra Soto, 4-year-old. Another four students and a teachers aid were injured in the crash.

Perpetrator 
Steven Allen Abrams was arrested and initially charged with assault with a deadly weapon. He was convicted of two counts of murder, five counts of attempted murder and two counts of attempted voluntary manslaughter; which also include a couple that were rammed by Abrams prior to the playground being targeted. In a taped confession that was played for jurors during the trial Abrams stated; "I was executing them....as many as I could get. [....] I was aiming for as many children as I could kill." On December 15, 2000, Abrams was sentenced to life in prison without parole. Previously on November 1, 2000, jurors had steered clear of the prosecution's request of the death penalty, but decided to give him life without parole instead. Since December 26, 2000, Abrams is currently at the California Medical Facility in Vacaville.

Aftermath 
The mother of Soto, Cindy Soto Beckett founded Sierra's Light Foundation to advocate for improved safety at preschools, and the mother of Wiener later founded the Brandon Cody Wiener Scholarship Fund in 2002, which sends young children victims of violent crimes to a week long summer camp in Bonsall.

See also
 List of homicides in California

References 

1999 murders in the United States
May 1999 events in the United States
Costa Mesa, California
Murder in California
1990s crimes in California
School killings in the United States
Vehicular rampage in the United States
Cadillac